Imran Khan (born 11 March 2001) is an Afghan cricketer. He made his first-class debut for Kabul Province in the 2018–19 Mirwais Nika Provincial 3-Day tournament on 2 March 2019.

References

External links
 

2001 births
Living people
Afghan cricketers
Place of birth missing (living people)